Franz Georg Hermann (29 December 1692, Kempten - 25 November 1768, Kempten) was a German painter in the Baroque style.

Life and work 
His first studies were with his father, the court painter, . Then, at the age of fifteen, the Benedictines awarded him 900 Guilders to study in Rome, where he attended at the Accademia di San Luca under Sebastiano Conca and, from 1713-14, lived in a room attached to the workshop of the sculptor Pierre Le Gros the Younger. He took further training in Venice with Giovanni Antonio Pellegrini and returned to Germany in 1718. Initially, he worked at Ottobeuren Abbey or in Füssen at St. Mang's Abbey, where he created ceilings and altarpieces.

Later, he worked in Immenstadt and Ettal. At St. Lorenz Basilica in Kempten, he painted the St. Nikolaus Dome and Benedict's Chapel in 1736 and returned in 1748 to create five oval altarpieces.

In the State Rooms of the Fürstäbtliche Residenz (a monastery complex), he painted the ceilings and walls as well as portraits of former Prince-abbots in the Residence Hall. He spent the years 1740 to 1742 painting the banquet hall at the "Ponikauhaus", an official residence for the Prince-abbot. In 1757, he produced his most extensive works for the library at Schussenried Abbey.

Overall, very few major religious structures within a twenty-mile or 30 km radius of Kempten are without frescoes, altarpieces or other works by Hermann.

Frescoes from the Schussenried Abbey library

References

Further reading 
Cordula Böhm: Franz Georg Hermann. Der Deckenmaler des Allgäus im 18. Jahrhundert. Dissertation, Ludwig Maximilian University of Munich 1968.
Georg Dehio: Handbuch der Deutschen Kunstdenkmäler. Baden-Württemberg II. Munich and Berlin 1997.
Georg Dehio: Handbuch der Deutschen Kunstdenkmäler. Bayern III. Schwaben. Munich and Berlin 2008.
 Franz Georg Hermann, 1692-1768: Festschrift der Stadt Kempten (Allgau) zum 300. Geburtstag am 29. Dezember 1992, (exhibition catalog), T. Dannheimer 1992

External links 

1692 births
1768 deaths
18th-century German painters
18th-century German male artists
German male painters
Religious artists